Erick Walder (born November 5, 1971 in Mobile, Alabama) is an American former long jumper. He was a silver medalist at the 1997 World Championships in Athletics and twice bronze medallist at the IAAF World Indoor Championships (1995, 1999). He also took two silver medals at the Goodwill Games (1994, 1998).

His personal best was 8.74 meters, achieved in April 1994 in El Paso. He ranked number one in the world on performance in the 1994 and 1996 seasons.

Collegiate career

Walder competed collegiately for the long jump/triple jump juggernaut University of Arkansas where he won 10 NCAA long jump and triple jump titles, indoor and outdoor. Walder was inducted into The University of Arkansas Hall of Fame in 2010.

Walder claimed the NCAA outdoor and indoor long jumps and the indoor triple jump titles in 1992, 1993 and 1994, and added the outdoor triple jump win to sweep the 1994 NCAA meets:

Walder finished 3rd in the triple jump at the 1993 NCAA Outdoor Championships.

International competitions

Rankings

Walder was ranked in the top ten long jumpers in the world by  Track and Field News for eight consecutive years and as the best long jumper in the US three times.

Drug issues

In 2004, Walder tested positive for a legal medication that is banned by USATF. The sample was delivered on June 5, 2004 at the IAAF Adidas Oregon Track Classic. He received an IAAF suspension from October 2004 to October 2006. Walder was reinstated in 2007. He competed professionally for two years before his retirement in 2010.

Personal life
In 2008, Walder married Denise Chandler, a chiropractor. They reside with their son, EJ in Fayetteville. He has another son, Trenton Walder, who resides in Conway, Arkansas. They divorced in February 2018.

References

External links
 
 Erick Walder at USATF

1971 births
Living people
Sportspeople from Mobile, Alabama
Track and field athletes from Alabama
American male long jumpers
Goodwill Games medalists in athletics
World Athletics Championships athletes for the United States
World Athletics Championships medalists
Doping cases in athletics
American sportspeople in doping cases
University of Arkansas alumni
Arkansas Razorbacks men's track and field athletes
Competitors at the 1998 Goodwill Games
Competitors at the 1994 Goodwill Games